Simmons's tree frog (Hyloscirtus simmonsi) is a species of frogs in the family Hylidae endemic to Colombia. Its natural habitats are subtropical or tropical moist montane forests and rivers. It has been observedbetween 1100 and 2000 meters above sea level. It is threatened by habitat loss.

References

Hyloscirtus
Amphibians of Colombia
Amphibians described in 1989
Taxonomy articles created by Polbot